The 2018 DC Solar 200 was the fourth stock car race of the 2018 NASCAR Xfinity Series season and the 14th iteration of the event. The race was held on Saturday, March 10, 2018 in Avondale, Arizona, at ISM Raceway, a 1 mile (1.6 km) permanent low-banked tri-oval race track. The race took the scheduled 200 laps to complete. At race's end, Brad Keselowski of Team Penske would take control after the final pit stops to overcome a penalty and win his 37th career NASCAR Xfinity Series season and his first of his part-time season. To fill out the podium, Justin Allgaier of JR Motorsports and Kyle Busch of Joe Gibbs Racing would finish second and third, respectively.

Background 

ISM Raceway – also known as PIR – is a one-mile, low-banked tri-oval race track located in Avondale, Arizona. It is named after the nearby metropolitan area of Phoenix. The motorsport track opened in 1964 and currently hosts two NASCAR race weekends annually. PIR has also hosted the IndyCar Series, CART, USAC and the Rolex Sports Car Series. The raceway is currently owned and operated by International Speedway Corporation.

The raceway was originally constructed with a 2.5 mi (4.0 km) road course that ran both inside and outside of the main tri-oval. In 1991 the track was reconfigured with the current 1.51 mi (2.43 km) interior layout. PIR has an estimated grandstand seating capacity of around 67,000. Lights were installed around the track in 2004 following the addition of a second annual NASCAR race weekend.

ISM Raceway is home to two annual NASCAR race weekends, one of 13 facilities on the NASCAR schedule to host more than one race weekend a year. The track is both the first and last stop in the western United States, as well as the fourth and penultimate track on the schedule.

Entry list

Practice

First practice 
The first 50-minute practice session would occur on Friday, March 9, at 12:05 PM MST.

Second and final practice 
The second and final 50-minute practice session would occur on Friday, March 9, at 2:05 PM MST.

Qualifying 
Qualifying would take place on Saturday, March 10, at 11:05 AM MST.  Since ISM Raceway is under 2 miles (3.2 km), the qualifying system was a multi-car system that included three rounds. The first round was 15 minutes, where every driver would be able to set a lap within the 15 minutes. Then, the second round would consist of the fastest 24 cars in Round 1, and drivers would have 10 minutes to set a lap. Round 3 consisted of the fastest 12 drivers from Round 2, and the drivers would have 5 minutes to set a time. Whoever was fastest in Round 3 would win the pole.

No drivers would fail to qualify,

Full qualifying results

Race results 
Stage 1 Laps: 45

Stage 2 Laps: 45

Stage 3 Laps: 110

References 

2018 NASCAR Xfinity Series
NASCAR races at Phoenix Raceway
March 2018 sports events in the United States
2018 in sports in Arizona